The 2010–11 Illinois State Redbirds men's basketball team represented Illinois State University during the 2010–11 NCAA Division I men's basketball season. The Redbirds, led by fourth year head coach Tim Jankovich, played their home games at Redbird Arena and competed as a member of the Missouri Valley Conference.

They finished the season 12–19, 4–14 in conference play to finish in a tie for ninth place. They were the number nine seed for the Missouri Valley Conference tournament. They were defeated by Southern Illinois University in their opening round game.

Roster

Schedule

|-
!colspan=9 style=|Exhibition Season

|-
!colspan=9 style=|Regular Season

|-
!colspan=9 style=|Missouri Valley Conference (MVC) tournament

References

Illinois State Redbirds men's basketball seasons
Illinois State
Illinois State Redbirds Men's
Illinois State Redbirds Men's